Li Bing (李昞; d. 572), was a Chinese politician of the Northern Zhou dynasty, during the Northern and Southern dynasties period. He was the father of Li Yuan, the founding emperor of the Tang dynasty.

His father, Li Hu (李虎), served as a major general under the Western Wei general Yuwen Tai, and was created the Duke of Longxi in 554; Li Bing eventually inherited his father's title. Li Bing became the Duke of Tang (唐國公) in 22 September 564. He was affirmed as zhuguo again on 27 June 571. His posthumous title was the Benevolent Duke of Tang (唐仁公).

After Li Yuan became emperor, he was granted the title of Emperor Shizu (世祖皇帝).

Family 
Parents

 Father: Li Hu (李虎)
 Mother: Lady Liang (梁氏), posthumously named Empress Jinglie (景烈皇后)

Wife

 Lady Dugu, of the Dugu clan (独孤氏), daughter of Dugu Xin, later known as Empress Yuanzhen (元贞皇后)
 Li Yuan, Emperor Gaozu (唐高祖李淵), fourth son
 Princess Ton'an (同安公主), first daughter
 Married Wang Yu (王裕) and had issue (one son)
 Unknown:
 Li Cheng, Prince of Liang (梁王李澄), first son
 Li Zhan, Prince of Shu (蜀王李湛), second son
 Li Hong, Prince of Zheng (鄭王李洪), third son
 Lady Li (李氏)
 Married Lu Yu (鹿裕)

References 

 

572 deaths
Northern Zhou politicians
Year of birth uncertain